Gamhariya may refer to:

Gamhariya (community development block), Madhepura district, Bihar, India
Gamhariya, Parsa, a village development committee in Parsa District, Narayani Zone, Nepal
Gamhariya, Sarlahi, a village development committee in Sarlahi District, Janakpur Zone, Nepal